North Gaston High School is a public high school in the Gaston County Schools school district located in Dallas, North Carolina, United States. Its attendance range covers the central portion of northern Gaston County and it also serves the communities of Ranlo, Hardins, High Shoals, Ashebrook Park, Spencer Mountain, and parts of North Gastonia, as well as the surrounding rural areas. George Conner serves as principal. Assistant principals are Mary Beth Edwards, Marsha Michael and Jon Stauffer. Mike Patton serves as athletic director. Feeder middle schools are W.C. Friday and Holbrook.

History
North Gaston opened shortly after the merger of Gastonia City Schools, Gaston County Schools, and Cherryville City Schools; replacing Dallas High School and serving the central portion of northern Gaston County. The building was constructed at a cost of $2.5 million, or $ in current value.

Principals

(*) Dallas High School principal (1968–1971)

Facilities
Situated on 100 acres of land, the original single building was joined by a separate new classroom wing and a second gymnasium some years later.

Notable alumni
 Jake Buchanan, MLB pitcher
 Duane Ross, track and field Olympian

References

Public high schools in North Carolina
Schools in Gaston County, North Carolina